Madina Colony  is a neighbourhood in the Orangi municipality of Karachi, Pakistan. It is administered as part of Karachi West district, but was part of the Orangi Town borough until that was disbanded in 2011.

There are several ethnic groups in Madina Colony including Muhajirs, Sindhis, Kashmiris, Seraikis, Pakhtuns, Balochis, Memons, Bohras, Ismailis and Christians.

References

External links 
 Karachi Website

iam colony sector 11 street No.3

Neighbourhoods of Karachi
Orangi Town